Following the deposition of the Byzantine empress Irene of Athens, the throne of the Byzantine Empire passed to a relatively short-lived dynasty, the Nikephorian dynasty, named after its founder, Nikephoros I. The empire was in a weaker and more precarious position than it had been for a long time and its finances were problematic.

During this era Byzantium was almost continually at war on two frontiers which drained its resources, and like many of his predecessors, Nikephoros (802–811) himself died while campaigning against the Bulgars to the north. Furthermore, Byzantium's influence continued to wane in the west with the crowning of Charlemagne (800–814) as Holy Roman emperor by Pope Leo III at Old St. Peter's Basilica in Rome in the year 800 and the establishment of a new empire in Western Europe laying claim to the universal Roman monarchy.

Nikephoros I, 802–811 
Nikephoros I had been the empire's finance minister and on Irene's deposition immediately embarked on a series of fiscal reforms. His administrative reforms included re-organisation of the themata. He survived a civil war in 803 and, like most of the Byzantine emperors, found himself at war on three fronts. He suffered a major defeat at the Battle of Krasos in Phrygia in 805 and died on a campaign against the Bulgars.

Nikephoros' successors, 811–813 
Nikephoros was succeeded by his son and co-emperor, Staurakios (811). However, he was severely wounded in the same battle in which his father died and, after much controversy regarding the succession, was persuaded to abdicate later that year by the husband of his sister Prokopia, Michael I (811–813), who succeeded him.

Michael I pursued more diplomatic than military solutions. However, he engaged the Bulgar Khan Krum, the same who claimed the lives of his two predecessors, and was also defeated, severely weakening his position. Aware of a likely revolt he chose to abdicate given the grisly fate of so many prior overthrown emperors, ending the brief dynasty of Nikephoros.

Family tree of the Nikephorian dynasty

See also 
 Family tree of Byzantine emperors
 History of the Byzantine Empire
 Byzantine Empire under the Justinian dynasty
 Byzantine Empire under the Heraclian dynasty
 Byzantine Empire under the Isaurian dynasty
 Byzantine Empire under the Amorian dynasty

References 

810s disestablishments
 
9th century in the Byzantine Empire
802 establishments
9th-century disestablishments in Asia
9th-century disestablishments in Europe